Frank Cicutto is an Italian-born Australian business executive. He was chief executive officer of National Australia Bank (NAB) between 1999 and 2004.

Working life
Cicutto joined the National Australia Bank in 1967 as a 17-year-old. He was employed by NAB for 37 years, leaving as chief executive officer in 2004.

References

1950 births
Living people
Date of birth missing (living people)
Italian bankers
Australian bankers
Italian expatriates in Australia